The Duke Blue Devils men's basketball team represents Duke University in NCAA Division I college basketball and competes in the Atlantic Coast Conference (ACC). The team is fourth all-time in wins of any NCAA men's basketball program, and is currently coached by Jon Scheyer. 

Duke has won 5 NCAA Championships (tied with Indiana for fourth all-time behind UCLA, Kentucky, and North Carolina) and appeared in 11 Championship Games (third all-time) and 17 Final Fours (Tied for third all-time with Kentucky and only behind North Carolina and UCLA). Additionally, all of Duke’s championships were won after the NCAA instituted a shot clock. Duke has an NCAA-best .755 NCAA tournament winning percentage. Eleven Duke players have been named the National Player of the Year, and 71 players have been selected in the NBA draft.  Additionally, Duke has had 36 players named All-Americans (chosen 60 times) and 14 players named Academic All-Americans. Duke has been the Atlantic Coast Conference Champions a record 22 times, and also lays claim to 19 ACC regular season titles. Prior to joining the ACC, Duke won the Southern Conference championships five times. Duke has also finished the season ranked No. 1 in the AP poll seven times and is the all-time leader in total weeks ranked as the number one team in the nation by the AP with 135 weeks. Additionally, the Blue Devils have the third longest streak in the AP Top 25 in history with 200 consecutive appearances from 1996 to 2007, trailing only Kansas’s 231 consecutive polls from 2009 to 2021, and UCLA's 221 consecutive polls from 1966 to 1980.

Team history

Early years (1906–1953)
In 1906, Wilbur Wade Card, Trinity College's Athletic Director and a member of the Class of 1900, introduced the game of basketball to Trinity. The January 30 issue of The Trinity Chronicle headlined the new sport on its front page. Trinity's first game ended in a loss to Wake Forest, 24–10. The game was played in the Angier B. Duke Gymnasium, later known as The Ark. The Trinity team won its first title in 1920, the state championship, by beating the North Carolina State College of Agriculture and Engineering (now NC State) 25 to 24. Earlier in the season they had beaten the University of North Carolina 19–18 in the first match-up between the two schools. Trinity college then became Duke University.

Billy Werber, Class of 1930, became Duke's first All-American in basketball. The Gothic-style West Campus opened that year, with a new gym, later to be named for Coach Card. The Indoor Stadium opened in 1940. Initially it was referred to as an "Addition" to the gymnasium. Part of its cost was paid for with the proceeds from the Duke football team's appearance in the 1938 Rose Bowl. In 1972 it would be named for Eddie Cameron, head coach from 1929 to 1942.

In 1952, Dick Groat became the first Duke player to be named National Player of the Year. Duke left the Southern Conference to become a charter member of the Atlantic Coast Conference in 1953. The Duke team under Vic Bubas made its first appearance in the Final Four in 1963, losing 94–75 to Loyola in the semifinal. The next year, Bubas' team reached the national title game, losing to the Bruins of UCLA, who claimed 10 titles in the next 12 years. Bob Verga was Duke's star player in 1967.

Bill Foster (1974–1980)
The basketball program won its 1000th game in 1974, making Duke only the eighth school in NCAA history to reach that figure. In a turnaround, Coach Bill Foster's 1978 Blue Devils, who had gone 2–10 in the ACC the previous year, won the conference tournament and went on to the NCAA championship game, where they fell to Kentucky. Gene Banks, Mike Gminski ('80) and Jim Spanarkel ('79) ran the floor.

Mike Krzyzewski (1980–2022) 
Mike Krzyzewski was at Duke from 1980 to 2022.

5 National Championships – 2nd most all time, the last being in 2015
13 Final Fours as well as five in a row from 1988 to 1992
17 Elite Eights 
26 Sweet Sixteens and nine straight from 1998–2006
36 NCAA tournament berths
101 NCAA tournament wins (most ever)
14 No. 1 seeds 
28 conference titles (13 regular season, 15 tournament), 10 of the 13 ACC Tournament Titles from 1998–99 through 2010–11
15 30-win seasons
36 20-win seasons
Number 1 AP ranking in 17 of the past 28 seasons 
8 Naismith College Player of the Year Awards
9 National Defensive Players of the Year Awards
26 AP All-Americans
14 consensus first team All-Americans
11 NBA top-10 picks: T-1st
23 NBA Draft first round picks
1,202 career wins

Krzyzewski's teams made the Final Four in 1986, 1988, 1989, 1990, 1991, 1992, 1994, 1999, 2001, 2004, 2010, 2015 and 2022. 

In Krzyzewski's first season, the Blue Devils would finish the season with a 17–13 overall record and 6–8 record in ACC play. The team would later play in the NIT tournament advancing to the quarterfinals. Despite having a good record the previous season, the Blue Devils would struggle during the next two seasons finishing with 10 wins in 1982 and 11 wins in 1983. The 1984 team, led by Tommy Amaker & Johnny Dawkins, would bounce back in strong fashion finishing 24–10 and was ranked the No.14 in the AP and Coaches poll, but lost in the second round of the NCAA tournament to the Washington Huskies (having earned a first-round bye).
In 1985 Duke defeated Pepperdine in the first round of the NCAA tournament, for Krzyzewski's first tournament win, but lost to Boston College in the second round 74–73. 

Duke upset the heavily favored UNLV Runnin' Rebels 79–77 in the Final Four in 1991, a rematch of the 1990 final in which Duke lost by 30 points. The team, led by Christian Laettner, Bobby Hurley, Grant Hill, and Thomas Hill, went on to defeat Kansas 72–65 to win the university's first NCAA Championship. Ranked #1 all season and favored to repeat as national champions in 1992, Duke took part in a  game "acclaimed by many [as] the greatest college basketball game ever played," according to ESPN. In the Elite Eight, Duke met the Rick Pitino-led Kentucky Wildcats. It appeared Kentucky had sealed the win in overtime when guard Sean Woods hit a running shot off the glass in the lane to put Kentucky up by one with 2.1 seconds left on the clock. After a timeout, Duke's Grant Hill threw a full-court pass to Christian Laettner. Laettner took one dribble and nailed a turn-around jumper at the buzzer to send Duke into the Final Four with a 104–103 victory (The Shot). Duke went on to defeat sixth-seeded Michigan, led by the Fab Five as freshmen starters including Chris Webber, Jalen Rose and Juwan Howard, 71–51 to repeat as national champions. Following the successful repeat, Laettner was the only collegiate player to be chosen for the Dream Team that won Olympic gold in Barcelona, while Krzyzewski was an assistant coach under Chuck Daly of the Detroit Pistons in a precursor to his becoming Team USA coach in 2006 and coaching them to two gold medals.

They would later meet Kentucky for another classic regional final game, but blow a 17-point second half lead in losing to the Wildcats. The Blue Devils would lose the 1994 title game to Arkansas and their "Forty Minutes of Hell" defense. The next two seasons would see them fall to just 31–31, though they made the 1996 tournament with an 18–12 record, 8–8 in conference play. They would also fall in the 1999 title game, this time to Jim Calhoun and the UCONN Huskies. Duke defeated Arizona 82–72 to win its third NCAA Championship in 2001, becoming one of a handful of teams in NCAA Tournament history to defeat all of their tournament opponents by double digits. Krzyzewski was inducted into the Basketball Hall of Fame later that year. On April 5, 2010 Duke Men's Basketball won their fourth NCAA Championship by defeating Butler 61–59. On April 6, 2015 Duke's Men's Basketball won their fifth NCAA Championship by defeating Wisconsin 68–63. 

Coach K announced that the 2021–22 season would be his last coaching for Duke. Making it to the Final Four one last time, Duke fell just short of the championship game losing to the North Carolina Tar Heels 81–77 in the first ever meeting between the rivals in the NCAA Tournament.

Jon Scheyer (2022–present)
On June 2, 2022, Scheyer was named as the new head coach at Duke following Krzyzewski's retirement. On March 11, 2023, he became the first person to win an ACC tournament title as both a coach and a player.

Former Duke stars such as Jim Spanarkel, Gene Banks, Alaa Abdelnaby, Johnny Dawkins, Cherokee Parks, Bobby Hurley, Antonio Lang, Roshown McLeod, William Avery, Trajan Langdon, Grant Hill, Danny Ferry, Christian Laettner, Kenny Dennard, Brian Davis, Elton Brand, Shane Battier, Carlos Boozer, Chris Duhon, Mike Dunleavy, Dahntay Jones, Daniel Ewing, JJ Redick, Shavlik Randolph, Shelden Williams, Corey Maggette, Luol Deng, Josh McRoberts, Gerald Henderson, Andre Dawkins, Austin Rivers, Lance Thomas, Kyle Singler, Miles Plumlee, Mason Plumlee, Marshall Plumlee, Bob Verga, Quinn Cook, Nolan Smith, Jason Williams, Jabari Parker, Rodney Hood, Seth Curry, Kyrie Irving, Matt Jones, Amile Jefferson, Jahlil Okafor, Tyus Jones, Justise Winslow, Grayson Allen, Brandon Ingram, Luke Kennard, Jayson Tatum, Harry Giles, Frank Jackson, Gary Trent Jr., Trevon Duval, Marvin Bagley III, Wendell Carter Jr., RJ Barrett, Marques Bolden, Cam Reddish, Zion Williamson, Tre Jones, Vernon Carey Jr., Cassius Stanley, Jalen Johnson, Paolo Banchero, Mark Williams, Wendell Moore Jr., Trevor Keels and AJ Griffin have gone on to play in the NBA.

Many of Krzyzewski's assistants and former players, such as Tommy Amaker (Seton Hall, University of Michigan and Harvard), Bob Bender (Illinois State University and University of Washington), Chuck Swenson at William & Mary, Mike Brey (Delaware and Notre Dame), Jeff Capel (VCU, Oklahoma and Pittsburgh), Chris Collins (Northwestern), Johnny Dawkins (Stanford, UCF), Quin Snyder (Missouri, Utah Jazz, Atlanta Hawks), and Steve Wojciechowski (Marquette) have become head basketball coaches at major universities and the NBA, while Pete Gaudet is now the head coach of the India women's national basketball team.

Team captains 

Danny Ferry 
Christian Laettner 
Bobby Hurley
Grant Hill 
Greg Newton 
Shane Battier
Carlos Boozer 
Mike Dunleavy Jr 
JJ Redick 
Shelden Williams 
Rodney Hood 
Josh Hairston
Tyler Thornton
Quinn Cook
Amile Jefferson 
Grayson Allen
Matt Jones
Javin Delaurier
Jack White 
Tre Jones
Wendell Moore Jr.
Jeremy Roach

Results by season (1980–2023)

NCAA tournament seeding history 
The NCAA began seeding the tournament with the 1978 edition.

National championships

Final Four history

Complete NCAA tournament results 
The Blue Devils have appeared in the NCAA tournament 45 times. Their combined record is 114–39.

NIT results 
The Blue Devils have appeared in the National Invitation Tournament (NIT) five times. Their combined record is 5–6.

Key statistics 
As of the 2017–18 season, the Blue Devils' program record is as follows.

 

Duke has been ranked as the #1 team in the nation 235 weeks in their history.

Duke had not lost a non-conference game at Cameron from 2000 until 2019, when SFASU beat Duke in overtime (85–83). Duke maintains a tradition of hosting the previous season's Division II national champion in an exhibition game each November.

Cameron Indoor Stadium & Fanbase 

Cameron Indoor Stadium was completed on January 6, 1940, having cost $400,000.  At the time, it was the largest gymnasium in the country south of the Palestra at the University of Pennsylvania. Originally called Duke Indoor Stadium, it was renamed for Coach Cameron on January 22, 1972. The building originally included seating for 8,800, though standing room was sufficient to ensure that 12,000 could fit in on a particularly busy day. Then, as now, Duke students were allowed a large chunk of the seats, including those directly alongside the court. Renovations in 1987–1988 removed the standing room areas and added seats, bringing capacity to 9,314.

Cameron Crazies
Duke's men's basketball teams have had a decided home-court advantage for many years, thanks to the diehard students known as the Cameron Crazies. The hardwood floor has been dedicated and renamed Coach K Court in honor of head coach Mike Krzyzewski, and the tent city outside Cameron where students camp out before big games is known as Krzyzewskiville. In 1999, Sports Illustrated ranked Cameron the fourth best venue in all of professional and college sports, and USA Today referred to it as "the toughest road game in the nation".

Criticism 
Despite being one of the most successful programs in college basketball, many fans of other college teams have come to dislike  Duke.

Player awards

Retired numbers

National Players of the Year
Dick Groat Helms, UPI
Art Heyman AP, UPI, U.S. Basketball Writers
Johnny Dawkins  Naismith
Danny Ferry  Naismith, UPI, U.S. Basketball Writers
Christian Laettner  AP, Basketball Times, NABC, Naismith, Rupp, U.S. Basketball Writers, Wooden
Elton Brand  AP, NABC, Naismith, Rupp, U.S. Basketball Writers, Wooden, Sporting News
Shane Battier  AP, Basketball Times, Naismith, Rupp, U.S. Basketball Writers, Wooden, Sporting News
Jason Williams  AP, Basketball Times, NABC (2), Naismith, Rupp, U.S. Basketball Writers, Wooden, Sporting News
JJ Redick AP, Basketball Times, NABC, Naismith, Rupp (2), U.S. Basketball Writers, Wooden, Sporting News
Zion Williamson AP, NABC, Naismith, Sporting News, U.S. Basketball Writers, Wooden

ACC Men's Basketball Player of the Year
 

Art Heyman (1963)
Jeff Mullins (1964)
Steve Vacendak (1966)
Mike Gminski (1979)
Danny Ferry (1988, 1989)
Christian Laettner (1992)
Grant Hill (1994)
Elton Brand (1999)
Chris Carrawell (2000)
Shane Battier (2001)
JJ Redick (2005, 2006)
Nolan Smith (2011)
Jahlil Okafor (2015)
Marvin Bagley III (2018) 
Zion Williamson (2019)
Tre Jones (2020)

ACC Rookies of the Year

Jim Spanarkel (1976)
Mike Gminski (1977)
Gene Banks (1978)
Chris Duhon (2001)
Kyle Singler (2008)
Austin Rivers (2012)
Jabari Parker (2014)
Jahlil Okafor (2015)
Brandon Ingram (2016)
Marvin Bagley III (2018) 
Zion Williamson (2019)
Vernon Carey Jr. (2020)

Paolo Banchero (2022)
Kyle Filipowski (2023)

National Defensive Player of the Year
Tommy Amaker (1987)
Billy King (1988)
Grant Hill (1993)
Steve Wojciechowski (1998)
Shane Battier (1999, 2000, 2001)
Shelden Williams (2005, 2006)

ACC Defensive Player of the Year
(since 2005)
Shelden Williams (2005, 2006)
DeMarcus Nelson (2008)
Tre Jones (2020)
Mark Williams (2022)

Naismith Memorial Basketball Hall of Fame
Mike Krzyzewski (2001)
Grant Hill (2018)

McDonald's All-Americans 
The following 78 McDonald's All-Americans have signed and played for Duke. 

1977 – Gene Banks
1978 – Vince Taylor
1982 – Johnny Dawkins
1983 – Tommy Amaker & Martin Nessley 
1985 – Danny Ferry & Quin Snyder
1986 – Alaa Abdelnaby & Phil Henderson
1988 – Christian Laettner & Crawford Palmer 
1989 – Bobby Hurley & Billy McCaffrey 
1990 – Grant Hill 
1991 – Cherokee Parks 
1992 – Chris Collins 
1993 – Joey Beard 
1994 – Trajan Langdon, Ricky Price & Steve Wojciechowski 
1995 – Taymon Domzalski 
1996 – Nate James 
1997 – Elton Brand, Shane Battier & Chris Burgess 
1998 – Corey Maggette
1999 – Carlos Boozer, Mike Dunleavy Jr., Casey Sanders & Jay Williams
2000 – Chris Duhon 
2001 – Daniel Ewing 
2002 – Sean Dockery, JJ Redick, Shavlik Randolph & Michael Thompson
2003 – Luol Deng
2004 – DeMarcus Nelson
2005 – Eric Boateng, Greg Paulus & Josh McRoberts 
2006 – Gerald Henderson Jr., Jon Scheyer & Lance Thomas
2007 – Taylor King, Kyle Singler & Nolan Smith
2008 – Elliot Williams
2009 – Ryan Kelly & Mason Plumlee
2010 – Kyrie Irving 
2011 – Quinn Cook, Marshall Plumlee & Austin Rivers 
2012 – Amile Jefferson & Rasheed Sulaimon 
2013 – Matt Jones & Jabari Parker 
2014 – Grayson Allen, Tyus Jones, Jahlil Okafor & Justise Winslow 
2015 – Brandon Ingram, Chase Jeter & Luke Kennard
2016 – Marques Bolden, Frank Jackson & Jayson Tatum
2017 – Wendell Carter Jr., Trevon Duval & Gary Trent Jr. 
2018 – RJ Barrett, Tre Jones, Cam Reddish & Zion Williamson
2019 – Vernon Carey Jr., Matthew Hurt & Wendell Moore Jr. 
2020 – Jeremy Roach, DJ Steward, Mark Williams
2021 – Paolo Banchero & AJ Griffin

Current Blue Devils in the NBA
As of December 20, 2022, these former Blue Devils players were in the NBA: 

Semi Ojeleye (did not finish college career at Duke; transferred to SMU) – Los Angeles Clippers
Kyrie Irving (2011) – Dallas Mavericks
Austin Rivers (2012) – Minnesota Timberwolves
Seth Curry (2013) –  Brooklyn Nets
Mason Plumlee (2013) – Charlotte Hornets
Rodney Hood (2014) – free agent
Jabari Parker (2014) – free agent
Tyus Jones (2015) – Memphis Grizzlies
Justise Winslow (2015) – Portland Trail Blazers
Brandon Ingram (2016) – New Orleans Pelicans
Harry Giles (2017) – free agent
Frank Jackson (2017) – Salt Lake City Stars (G-League) 
Luke Kennard (2017) – Los Angeles Clippers
Jayson Tatum (2017) – Boston Celtics
Grayson Allen (2018) – Milwaukee Bucks
Marvin Bagley III (2018) – Detroit Pistons
Wendell Carter Jr. (2018) – Orlando Magic
Gary Trent Jr. (2018) – Toronto Raptors
RJ Barrett (2019) – New York Knicks
Cam Reddish (2019) – Portland Trail Blazers
Zion Williamson (2019) – New Orleans Pelicans
Marques Bolden (2019) – free agent
Vernon Carey Jr. (2020) – Washington Wizards
Tre Jones (2020) – San Antonio Spurs
Cassius Stanley (2020) – Motor City Cruise (G-League)
Jack White (basketball) (2020) – Denver Nuggets
Jalen Johnson (2021) – Atlanta Hawks
DJ Steward (2021) – Stockton Kings (G-League)
Paolo Banchero (2022) – Orlando Magic
Mark Williams (basketball) (2022) – Charlotte Hornets
AJ Griffin (2022) – Atlanta Hawks
Wendell Moore Jr. (2022) – Minnesota Timberwolves
Trevor Keels (2022) – New York Knicks

Rivalries
The Duke–North Carolina rivalry is often ranked among the top rivalries in both college basketball and all North American sports. The Duke Blue Devils face the North Carolina Tar Heels twice each year during ACC play, with thousands of Duke undergraduate students participating in an annual tradition of camping out in Krzyzewskiville, a lawn in front of Cameron Indoor Stadium, for months to line up for admission into the rivalry game. The two teams always face each other for their last game of the regular season, with the home team hosting their Senior Night. Some years, the two teams meet for a third game in the ACC tournament. In 2022, the two schools met in the Final Four to face each other in the NCAA Tournament for the first time. In that game, the Tar Heels defeated the Blue Devils 81–77.

The two programs have combined for 11 national championships, with North Carolina leading Duke 6–5. The intensity of the rivalry is augmented by the proximity of the two universities, located only ten miles apart along U.S. Highway 15–501 (also known as Tobacco Road) or eight miles apart in straight-line distance in the cities of Durham and Chapel Hill. In addition, Duke is a private university whereas North Carolina is a public school; the vastly different funding structures and cultures between the two further contribute to the intensity of the rivalry.

Former Esquire editor and author (and North Carolina graduate) Will Blythe argues that the rivalry's passion can be attributed greatly to class and culture in the South.

The rivalry has been the subject of various books and articles, including To Hate Like This Is to Be Happy Forever by Blythe and Blue Blood by Art Chansky.

Further illustrating the intensity of the rivalry, U.S. Representative Brad Miller, a die-hard Carolina fan, told an Associated Press writer in 2012, "I have said very publicly that if Duke was playing against the Taliban, then I'd have to pull for the Taliban."

However, also due to the close proximity of the two schools, there is respect and collaboration within the rivalry. Inspired by the men's basketball teams, twenty-four students from the two schools got together from January 14–16, 2006 in order to attempt to break the world record for the longest continuous game of basketball ever recorded. The game set a new world record at 57 hours, 17 minutes and 41 seconds with Duke winning the game 3699–3444. All $60,000 raised from the marathon benefited the Hoop Dreams Basketball Academy, an organization which helps children with life-threatening illnesses develop successful life skills through basketball.

Beyond athletics, the school papers have also engaged in the rivalry. As a tradition, one day prior to a Duke-Carolina basketball game, The Chronicle, Duke's student newspaper, publishes a spoof cover page for the day's edition with the title The Daily Tar Hole. Contained within are satirical stories poking fun at The Daily Tar Heel and the North Carolina Tar Heels.  The Daily Tar Heel typically publishes former columnist Ian Williams' "Insider's guide to hating Duke" for the two basketball match-ups each year.  There is a longstanding agreement that if Duke wins the first matchup, The Daily Tar Heels masthead is printed in Duke blue, and if Carolina wins the first matchup, The Chronicles masthead is painted Carolina blue. The losing school's paper also has to put the other school's logo in a conspicuous location and claim that the winning school is "still the best."

The Michigan Wolverines and the Maryland Terrapins basketball teams have also claimed rivalries against the Blue Devils, but Duke has long rejected both claims and considers North Carolina to be its only rival.

By the numbers
 All-time wins – 2,271
 All-time winning Percentage – .712
 NCAA championships – 5
 NCAA Tournament runner-up – 6
 All-Americans – 49 players
 ACC regular season titles – 23
 ACC Tournament titles – 22  (most all-time)
 NCAA championship games – 11
 NCAA Final Fours – 17
 NCAA Tournament appearances – 45
 NCAA Tournament wins – 118
 No. 1 seeds in the NCAA Tournament – 14
 Number of weeks ranked all-time in the top 25 of the AP Poll – 870
 Number of times defeating the No. 1 ranked team in the country – 10

Victories over AP No. 1 team
Duke has 10 victories over the AP number one ranked team.
January 27, 1958 – NR Duke 72, No. 1 West Virginia, 68
December 10, 1965 – No. 8 Duke 82, No. 1 UCLA 66
December 11, 1965 – No. 8 Duke 94, No. 1 UCLA 75
March 11, 1984 – No. 16 Duke 77, No. 1 UNC 75
March 26, 1988 – No. 5 Duke 63, No. 1 Temple 53
March 30, 1991 – No. 2 Duke 79, No. 1 Nevada-Las Vegas 77 
December 5, 1992 – No. 4 Duke 79, No. 1 Michigan 68
November 26, 1997 – No. 4 Duke 95, No. 1 Arizona 87
February 22, 2014 – No.5 Duke 66, No. 1 Syracuse 60
November 26, 2021 – No. 5 Duke 84, No. 1 Gonzaga 81

See also
 Coach K
 Cameron Indoor Stadium
 Krzyzewskiville
 Cameron Crazies
 Duke Blue Devils
 Atlantic Coast Conference
 Carolina–Duke rivalry
 Duke Blue Devils women's basketball

Footnotes

References

External links

 

 
Basketball teams established in 1905
1905 establishments in North Carolina